Girl Talk may refer to:

Music
 Girl Talk (duo), a 1980s British girl group
 Girl Talk (musician), Gregg Michael Gillis (born 1981), American music producer and mashup artist

Albums
 Girl Talk (Holly Cole album), 1990
 Girl Talk (Kate Nash album), 2013
 Girl Talk (Lesley Gore album), 1964
 Girl Talk (Oscar Peterson album), 1968
 Girl Talk (Shirley Scott album), 1967

Songs
 "Girl Talk" (Dhani Lennevald song), 2004
 "Girl Talk" (Neal Hefti song), written by Neal Hefti and Bobby Troup, 1964
 "Girl Talk" (TLC song), 2002
 "Girl Talk"/"The Speed Star", by Namie Amuro, 2004
 "Girl Talk", a jazz instrumental by Cindy Bradley feat. Paula Atherton, 2017

Television
Girl Talk, a 1963–1969 talk show hosted by Virginia Graham
Girl Talk, a 1989 talk show hosted by Sarah Michelle Gellar and Russell Koplin
 "Girl Talk" (Fuller House), a 2016 episode
 "Girl Talk" (The Paynes), a 2018 episode
 "Girl Talk" (Roseanne), a 1994 episode

Other uses
 Girl Talk (board game), a 1988 board game
 Girl Talk (books), a 1990–1992 series of novels for teenage girls by L. E. Blair
 Girl Talk (magazine), a British magazine aimed at preteens
 Girl Talk Inc., an international student-to-student mentoring program
 Girl Talk, a 1989 film directed by Frank Harris

See also 
 Girls Talk (disambiguation)